Georges Vanier Catholic School is an elementary school in the community of Beaverbrook, in Ottawa, Ontario, Canada. (Next door is the W. Erskine Johnston Public School.) It has classes from junior kindergarten to grade 6.  The school is in the Zone 2 (Kanata) school board district of the Ottawa Catholic School Board.

History
The school is named after former Canadian Governor General Georges Vanier who died in 1967, the same year the school opened. The school logo has a stylized initial "G" superimposed on the initial "V," with a maple leaf commemorating Canada's Centennial Year of 1967, the year in which the school opened, and a cross in the background. The white background and the red outline of the logo reflect the school colours.

Prior to the school's opening, the students were being housed at Our Lady Of Peace Catholic School in nearby Bells Corners.

Georges Vanier has seen its student population fluctuate over time, often creating the need for up to eight portables on site prior to the formation of another school. Five schools have been constructed to relieve over crowding: St Martin De Porress Catholic School, Holy Redeemer Catholic School, St Gabriels, St James Catholic School and St Anne Catholic School.

The school celebrated its 25th anniversary in 1992

Principals
Greg Peddie
Russ Graham
Garry Valiquette
Margaret McGrath
Andy Groulx
Bert O’Connor
Robert Curry
Marcia Lynch
Susan Mcarthy
Heather MacPhee
Caroline O'Connor

References

External links 
 Georges Vanier Catholic School 
 Ottawa Catholic School Board 
 Georges Vanier School History

Elementary schools in Ottawa
Catholic elementary schools in Ontario